The Men's high jump event took place on July 9, 2011, at the Kobe Universiade Memorial Stadium.

Medalists

Records

Results

Final

References

High jump
High jump at the Asian Athletics Championships